Orovička Planina is a village in Serbia. It is situated in the Ljubovija municipality, in the Mačva District of Central Serbia. The village had an entirely Serbian population of 201 in 2002.

Historical population

1948: 487
1953: 521
1961: 519
1971: 431
1981: 356
1991: 283
2002: 201

References

See also
List of places in Serbia

Populated places in Mačva District
Ljubovija